Castellana Grotte is a town and comune in the Metropolitan City of Bari, Apulia, southern Italy. Grotte means "caves" in Italian.

History

Geography

Caves
One of the most important attractions in Apulia are the caves of Castellana Grotte, a system of caverns of the karst origin. Stalagmites, stalactites, canyons and caves characterise this pathway long 3 km to more than 60 meters deep. The Grotte of Castellana were discovered January 23, 1938 by cavers Franco Anelli and Vito Matarrese.

Notable residents
Francesco Laporta, professional golfer.

See also
Castellana Caves

References

External links

 Comune of Castellana Grotte
 The caves of Castellana

Cities and towns in Apulia